The Sierra Juarez hidden salamander (Thorius adelos), also known as the Sierra Juarez moss salamander, or simply Sierra Juarez salamander, is a species of salamander in the family Plethodontidae. It is endemic to the Caribbean slopes of the Sierra de Juarez and Sierra Mazateca, Oaxaca, Mexico.

Description
The dorsum and tail are brown. There is a dorsal, cream-coloured stripe on both sides. The snout is blunt with slightly upward-tilted nostrils.

Habitat and conservation
It is found in bromeliads and other epiphytic plants and in leaf-litter. It is threatened by habitat loss caused by logging, expanding agriculture, and human settlements.

References

Thorius
Salamander, Sierra Juarez hidden
Fauna of the Sierra Madre de Oaxaca
Endangered biota of Mexico
Endangered fauna of North America
Amphibians described in 1987
Taxa named by David B. Wake
Taxonomy articles created by Polbot